This is a list of separatist movements recognized by intergovernmental organizations.

Background 
The United Nations General Assembly, by resolution 3247 (XXIX) of 29 November 1974, decided to invite also the nationalist movements recognized by the Organization of African Unity (OAU, later transformed into the AU) and/or by the League of Arab States (AL) in their respective regions to participate in the United Nations Conference on the Representation of States in Their Relations with International Organizations as observers.

The Conference adopted a resolution on the status of "national liberation movements", and similar provisions were also adopted by the UNGA.

The UNGA recognized some of these nationalist movements as representatives of the people of their respective territories, along with their right to self-determination, national independence and sovereignty there. In 1973 South West Africa People's Organization was recognized as representative of the Namibian people and gained UN observer entity status in 1976. In 1974 the UN took similar decision for the Palestine Liberation Organization and it was also given the status of UN observer entity The OAU and the UN have contacts with the Polisario Front and the Sahrawi Arab Democratic Republic (established by the Polisario Front) is member state of the OAU since 1982. Since 1991 the UN is maintaining a peacekeeping mission in Western Sahara overseeing a cease-fire between Morocco and the Polisario Front. The goal of the mission is to conduct a referendum on the status of Western Sahara.

The aim of these movements is to eventually establish independent states and some of them have already succeeded. After independence most of the liberation movements transform into political parties – governing or oppositional. The most recent of these that finished the process of decolonization in its territory was SWAPO that established Namibia in 1990.

The Organisation of Islamic Cooperation (OIC, formerly the Organisation of the Islamic Conference) also recognized some nationalist movements.

List

See also 
 United Nations list of non-self-governing territories
 Wars of national liberation
 Liberation movement
 African independence movements
 Unrepresented Nations and Peoples Organization
 List of historical separatist movements
 Lists of active separatist movements
 Decolonisation of Africa
 Decolonization of Asia

Notes

References

External links 
 Representation of States in their relations with international organizations

History of colonialism
 

pt:Lista de movimentos de libertação